Mounted Fury is a 1931 American drama film directed by Stuart Paton and written by Betty Burbridge. The film stars John Bowers, Blanche Mehaffey, Robert Ellis, Frank Rice, George Regas and Lina Basquette. The film was released on December 1, 1931, by Sono Art-World Wide Pictures.

Cast          
John Bowers as Jim Leyton
Blanche Mehaffey as Enid Mash
Robert Ellis as Paul Marsh
Frank Rice as Sandy McNab
George Regas as Pierre LeStrange
Lina Basquette as Nanette LeStrange
John Ince as Big McGraw
Lloyd Whitlock as Dick Simpson
Jack Trent as Phil Grover

References

External links
 

1931 films
American drama films
1931 drama films
Films directed by Stuart Paton
American black-and-white films
1930s English-language films
1930s American films